The 1941 football season was São Paulo's 12th season since the club's founding in 1930.

Overall

{|class="wikitable"
|-
|Games played || 39 (20  Campeonato Paulista, 19 Friendly match)
|-
|Games won || 20 (13 Campeonato Paulista, 7 Friendly match)
|-
|Games drawn || 10 (5 Campeonato Paulista, 5 Friendly match)
|-
|Games lost || 9 (2 Campeonato Paulista, 7 Friendly match)
|-
|Goals scored || 91
|-
|Goals conceded || 67
|-
|Goal difference || +24
|-
|Best result || 6–1 (A) v São Caetano - Friendly match - 1941.12.14
|-
|Worst result || 3–7 (H) v Fluminense - Friendly match - 1941.12.21
|-
|Most appearances || 
|-
|Top scorer || 
|-

Friendlies

Official Competitions

Campeonato Paulista

Record

External links
official website 

Association football clubs 1941 season
1941
1941 in Brazilian football